Varde was the municipality where the traditional blue bloc got the 4th highest % of vote share in the 2019 Danish general election. Venstre had won a majority of seats in 2009 and 2013, but had come one short in 2017, although they still had managed to find a majority that would support them holding the mayor position.

In 2020, Erik Buhl Nielsen from Venstre, who had been mayor for the last 2 terms, announced that would not stand for a third term. Instead Mads Sørensen would be the candidate from Venstre. He would succeed in being elected for the mayor position, despite Venstre losing 2 seats, and thus receiving their worst election result since the 2007 municipal reform. The traditional blue bloc itself would gain 2 seats.

The Christian Democrats would win its first seat in the municipality since the 2007 municipal reform, and it would be the only seat they would win in a municipality from the South Jutland constituency.

Electoral system
For elections to Danish municipalities, a number varying from 9 to 31 are chosen to be elected to the municipal council. The seats are then allocated using the D'Hondt method and a closed list proportional representation.
Varde Municipality had 25 seats in 2021

Unlike in Danish General Elections, in elections to municipal councils, electoral alliances are allowed.

Electoral alliances  

Electoral Alliance 1

Electoral Alliance 2

Electoral Alliance 3

Electoral Alliance 4

Results

Notes

References 

Varde